Tridell (also Liberty) is an unincorporated community in the Uinta Basin in western Uintah County, Utah, United States.

Description

The settlement lies along local roads north of State Route 121, north of the city of Vernal, the county seat of Uintah County. Until the highway was deleted from the state highway system in 1969, Tridell was the northern terminus for State Route 246. Its elevation is 5,636 feet (1,718 m), and it is located at  (40.4535682, -109.8498700). Although Tridell is unincorporated, it has had a post office, with the ZIP code of 84076, since 1918. (However, the post office became a rural station in 1964.)

Climate
According to the Köppen Climate Classification system, Tridell has a semi-arid climate, abbreviated "BSk" on climate maps.

See also

References

External links

Unincorporated communities in Uintah County, Utah
Unincorporated communities in Utah